Sigert O. Patursson (October 15, 1869 – September 17, 1931) was a Faroese explorer.

Patursson was born in Kirkjubøur, the son of Poul Peder Pedersen (a.k.a. Páll Patursson), a holder of publicly owned land, and Ellen Cathrine (née Djonesen). His siblings Helena, Jóannes, Sverri, Gazet and Petur were all prominent figures in Faroese society. The siblings were home schooled by Joen Hans Jacob Petersen, the brother of Fríðrikur Petersen.

In 1889, at the age of 20, Sigert Patursson traveled to western Siberia and the Kara Sea. The journey lasted six years, and when he returned to the Faroe Islands he wrote the book Sibirien i vore Dage (Siberia Today). The book was published in 12 fascicles from 1900 to 1901, and then combined into a single book with the same title in 1901. In addition to the journey itself, the book focuses on the culture that he discovered there. Among other things, he described a local peasant wedding. A Faroese translation of the book by Sigrið av Skarði Joensen was published in 1994. Patursson also traveled to many other lands, including Mongolia and Egypt, which was very unusual for a Faeroese at that time.

Sigert Patursson also wrote several works in support of Faroese independence. He also called for an independent and more varied Faroese economy, envisioning reforestation, seaweed export, coal mining, a textile industry, mills for wool-spinning, and hydropower. Patursson was broadly ridiculed at the time for these suggestions, with newspaper headlines such as "Is manden rigtig klog?" (Is the Man Crazy?). However, his vision was also praised by some.

References

Further reading
Patursson, Sigert. 1901. Sibirien i vore Dage : Kulturhistoriske Optegnelser og Oplevelser under et ca. seksaarigt Ophold og Rejser i nordlige og sydlige Egne af Vestsibirien samt ved der kariske Hav.. Copenhagen: Brandt.
Sigurðardóttir, Turið. 1994. Sigert (biography). Tórshavn: Ungu Føroyar.

Faroese writers
Explorers of Siberia
1869 births
1931 deaths
People from Kirkjubøur